Eduardo Dibós Chappuis (22 June 1927 – 15 October 1973), called "Chachi", was a Peruvian racing driver and politician in the early 1970s. He was the mayor of Lima from 1970 to 1973. He was son of Eduardo Dibós Dammert.

Dibós raced in the 1959 Daytona 500, the inaugural edition of the race. He owned a very important Ferrari motorcar from 1961 until Jan 1965 - A 250 SWB Berlinetta Serial number 03175, believed to be the 250 GTO Prototipo vehicle. He raced this car in many races, including the 1964 24 Hours of Daytona finishing 10th in Class, to the likes of Pedro Rodriguez, Phil Hill & David Piper all driving superior 250 GTO machines.

Mayors of Lima
1973 deaths
Peruvian racing drivers
Peruvian people of French descent
Peruvian sportsperson-politicians
1927 births